Georges Groussard (born 22 March 1937) is a retired French road cyclist. Groussard rode professionally from 1960 to 1967. He participated in 7 Tours de France, and wore the yellow jersey for 9 consecutive days in 1964. His best overall result was also in 1964, when he finished 5th place in the overall classification.
His elder brother Joseph Groussard was also a professional cyclist.

Since 1995, the race La Georges Groussard is dedicated to him.

Major results

1959
Winner Mican-Morvan (amateur race)
1961
2nd place Paris–Nice
3rd place Tour de Luxembourg
1962
Winner in Plumeliau
1963
Winner in Plumeliau
1964
2nd place in French national road race championship
2nd place in Preslin
2nd place in Sévignac

Tour de France results
 1961: 30th place
 1962: 72nd place
 1963: 51st place
 1964: 5th place, 10 days in yellow jersey
 1965: did not finish: gave up in stage 3
 1966: 30th place
 1967: Team: France 3 (start number 127), did not finish; out of time on stage 8

References

External links 

 

Info about the stages where Groussard wore the yellow jersey 
Official Tour de France results for Georges Groussard

1937 births
Living people
French male cyclists
Sportspeople from Ille-et-Vilaine
Cyclists from Brittany